Blair Soper (born 26 October 1991) is a New Zealand cricketer who plays for Otago. He made his first-class debut on 12 November 2012 in the 2015–16 Plunket Shield. He made his List A debut on 21 November 2019, for Otago in the 2019–20 Ford Trophy.

See also
 List of Otago representative cricketers

References

External links
 

1991 births
Living people
New Zealand cricketers
Otago cricketers
Cricketers from Dunedin